Constance II of Sicily ( – ) was Queen consort of Aragon as the wife of Peter III of Aragon and a pretender to the Kingdom of Sicily from 1268 to 1285. She was the only daughter of Manfred of Sicily and his first wife, Beatrice of Savoy.

Life
Constance was largely raised by Bella d'Amichi, who remained her favorite and confidante as queen. On 13 June 1262, Constance married Peter, eldest son of King James I of Aragon. Her father was killed in the Battle of Benevento (26 February 1266) while fighting against his rival, Charles of Anjou. She inherited his claim to the Sicilian throne.
According to author E.L. Miron in her book "The Queens of Aragon" Constance was the first Queen of Aragon whose coronation was recorded as taking place, in Zaragossa on November 17, 1276.

James I died on 27 July 1276 and Peter succeeded to the throne with Constance as queen. During the War of the Sicilian Vespers (1282–1302), Peter and then their sons claimed the throne of Sicily in her right. The war resulted in the partition of the Kingdom of Sicily and the creation of the Kingdom of Trinacria under her heirs and the Kingdom of Naples under the heirs of Charles of Anjou.

Peter III died on November 1285. Constance died as a nun in Barcelona.

Role in Dante's Divine Comedy 
Though most historical sources have little information about her, Constance occupies a place in Dante Alighieri's Divine Comedy. Constance's appearance in Canto III of Purgatorio of the Divine Comedy is understated and shadow-like. The reader learns of Constance through the speech of her father, Manfred of Sicily, whom Dante meets in the space of Mount Purgatory reserved for excommunicated souls. Manfred begs the poet to bring the truth "if another tale is told [to his] fair daughter, mother of the pride of Sicily and Aragon." Manfred proceeds to tell Dante of how he repented and confessed to God for his "horrible" sins shortly before his death, and was thus saved from an afterlife in Hell, contrary to what others may have thought. Manfred concludes his speech by telling Dante that his sentence in Purgatory may be lessened if those still alive on Earth pray for him, and subsequently by asking Dante to tell Constance of his current placement and of how her "holy prayers" can aid in his movement toward Paradise.

Children
Constance and Peter III of Aragon had six children:

Alfonso III of Aragon ( – ).
James II of Aragon ( – ).
Elizabeth, Queen of Portugal ( – ). Married Denis of Portugal.
Frederick III of Sicily ( – ).
Yolande, Duchess of Calabria ( – ). Married Robert of Naples.
Peter of Aragon ( – ). Married Guillemette of Béarn, daughter of Gaston VII, Viscount of Béarn.

Ancestry

References

Sources

Aragonese queen consorts
Countesses of Barcelona
Royal consorts of Sicily
13th-century Kings of Sicily
Queens regnant in Europe
1249 births
1302 deaths
Hohenstaufen
House of Aragon
People of the War of the Sicilian Vespers
Burials at Barcelona Cathedral
13th-century Italian women
13th-century Sicilian people
13th-century people from the Kingdom of Aragon
Women in medieval European warfare
Women in 13th-century warfare
13th-century women rulers
Roman Catholic royal saints
Queen mothers